NVivo is a qualitative data analysis (QDA) computer software package produced by QSR International.  NVivo helps qualitative researchers to organize, analyze and find insights in unstructured or qualitative data like interviews, open-ended survey responses, journal articles, social media and web content, where deep levels of analysis on small or large volumes of data are required.

NVivo is used predominantly by academic, government, health and commercial researchers across a diverse range of fields, including social sciences such as anthropology, psychology, communication, sociology, as well as fields such as forensics, tourism, criminology and marketing.

The first QSR International software product was developed by Tom and Lyn Richards. Originally called NUD*IST, it contained tools for fine and detailed analysis of unstructured textual data. In 1999, the Richards developed the first version of NVivo and eventually N6 was replaced by NVivo 7.

Description
NVivo is intended to help users organize and analyze non-numerical or unstructured data. The software allows users to classify, sort and arrange information; examine relationships in the data; and combine analysis with linking, shaping, searching and modeling.

The researcher or analyst can identify trends and cross-examine information in a multitude of ways using its search engine and query functions. They can make notes in the software using memos and build a body of evidence to support their case or project.

NVivo accommodates a wide range of research methods, including network and organizational analysis, action or evidence-based research, discourse analysis, grounded theory, conversation analysis, ethnography, literature reviews, phenomenology, mixed methods research and the Framework methodology. NVivo supports data formats such as audio files, videos, digital photos, Word, PDF, spreadsheets, rich text, plain text and web and social media data. Users can interchange data with applications like Microsoft Excel, Microsoft Word, IBM SPSS Statistics, EndNote, Microsoft OneNote, SurveyMonkey and Evernote.

Users can purchase add-on modules: NVivo Transcription for automated transcriptions, where users can transcribe directly in NVivo (Release 1.0); and NVivo Collaboration Cloud, that uses the cloud to enable small team project sharing and collaboration.

NVivo - Windows is available in English, Chinese (Simplified), French, German and Japanese, Spanish and Portuguese. NVivo - Mac is available in English, French, German, Japanese and Spanish.

Version history
Note: software named NUD*IST from 1981 to 1997
.
 N4 – 1997
 N5 – 2000
 N6 – 2002
 NVivo 2 – 2002
 NVivo 7 – 2006 (consolidation of NVivo and N6 (NUD*IST))
 NVivo 8 – 2008
 NVivo 9 and NVivo for Teams – 2010
 NVivo 10 – 2012
 NVivo for Mac Beta – 2014
 NVivo for Mac commercial release – 2014
 NVivo 11 for Windows in three editions; NVivo Starter, NVivo Pro, NVivo Plus. Updates to NVivo for Mac and NVivo for Teams – 2015
 NVivo 12 (Pro, Plus, Mac, and Teams) – 2018
 NVivo (Release 1.0) / Nvivo 1.0 – March 18, 2020 (Windows & Mac). As previously, the Mac version has fewer features. QSR also released Collaboration Cloud for sharing projects (within OS only). The Plus and Pro versions from NVivo 12 have been combined.

See also
 Computer-assisted qualitative data analysis software

References

External links

QDA software